The North-Western Journal of Zoology is an open access peer-reviewed scientific journal on zoology and animal ecology. It is the official journal of the Herpetological Club of Oradea (Romania). It was established in 2005.

The journal is indexed and abstracted in the Science Citation Index Expanded, The Zoological Record, Scopus, and EBSCOhost.

See also
 List of zoology journals

External links

 

Zoology journals
Biannual journals
Publications established in 2005
English-language journals
Open access journals